Sergius Ogun is a Nigerian politician, lawyer and a member House of Representatives of Nigeria.

Early life and education 

Sergius Oseasochie Ogun was born in 1963 to the Ogun family from Uromi in Esan North East Local Government Area of Edo State.

Hon. Ogun graduated with a West African Senior Certificate in 1983 from St. John Grammar School in Fugar, Edo State (WASC). In 2003, he also earned a Bachelor of Laws (LL.B) from the University of Benin in Edo State.

Career

Politics 
He was elected in 2015 to the Federal House of Representatives on the People's Democratic Party (PDP) platform to represent the Esan North-East/Esan South-East Constituency. He is a member of the House Committee on the Federal Capital Territory in Abuja.

References 

Edo State politicians
1963 births
Living people
Members of the House of Representatives (Nigeria)
Peoples Democratic Party (Nigeria) politicians